This is a list of people with color blindness, meaning they have a decreased ability to see color or differences in color.

A–Z

References

People
Colorblind People
Colorblind People
Colorblind People